Sour crude oil is crude oil containing a high amount of the impurity sulfur. It is common to find crude oil containing some impurities. When the total sulfur level in the oil is more than 0.5% (by weight), the oil is called "sour".

The impurities need to be removed before this lower-quality crude can be refined into petrol, thereby increasing the cost of processing. This results in a higher-priced gasoline than that made from sweet crude oil.

Current environmental regulations in the United States strictly limit the sulfur content in refined fuels such as diesel and gasoline.

The majority of the sulfur in crude oil occurs bonded to carbon atoms, with a small amount occurring as elemental sulfur in solution and as hydrogen sulfide gas. Sour oil can be toxic and corrosive, especially when the oil contains higher levels of hydrogen sulfide, which is a breathing hazard. At low concentrations the gas gives the oil the smell of rotting eggs. For safety reasons, sour crude oil needs to be stabilized by having hydrogen sulfide gas (H2S) removed from it before being transported by oil tankers.

Since sour crude is more common than sweet crude in the U.S. part of the Gulf of Mexico, Platts has come out in March 2009 with a new sour crude benchmark (oil marker) called "Americas Crude Marker (ACM)". Dubai Crude and Oman Crude, both sour crude oils, have been used as a benchmark (crude oil) oil marker for Middle East crude oils for some time.

The major producers of sour crude oil include:
North America: Alberta (Canada), United States' portion of the Gulf of Mexico, Alaska and Mexico.
South America: Venezuela, Colombia, and Ecuador.
Middle East: Saudi Arabia, Iraq, Kuwait, Iran, Syria, and Egypt.

See also

References

Petroleum